Joy McKean , (born 14 January 1930), is an Australian country music singer-songwriter and wife and manager of the late Slim Dusty. Known as the "grand lady" of Australian country music, McKean is recognised as one of Australia's leading songwriters and bush balladeers and wrote several of Dusty's most popular songs. In 1973, she was awarded the first ever Golden Guitar, for writing "Lights on the Hill". She was inducted into the Australian Roll of Renown in 1983. The 2020 documentary film Slim and I told the story of her life and musical partnership with Dusty. The McKean-Dusty musical partnership produced over 100 albums, sold eight million records in Australia alone, and earned 45 Golden Guitars.

Biography

Early life and career
Joy McKean was born in Singleton in the Hunter Region, New South Wales on 14 January 1930. As an infant, McKean lived on the dairy farm belonging to her mother's family. Her father was a country school teacher and the family moved around to several regional centres during her youth. Her mother and their father, who was a steel guitar player, encouraged an interest in different types of music, including country performers Jimmie Rogers and the Carter Family. Joy learned the accordion, piano and steel guitar, while younger sister Heather McKean learned the ukulele and both took up yodeling. McKean also contracted polio as a child and was treated in Sydney by the famous Sister Kenny.

McKean first performed on the radio for the first time around the age of 10 on Sydney's 2GB radio station. Later McKean and her sister, Heather McKean (born 20 February 1932), sang for the Sydney University Revue, while a student at the university. By the age of 18, in the 1940s, she was performing live with her sister Heather on their own half-hour Saturday radio show on 2KY as the McKean Sisters, noted for their yodelling harmonies. The Melody Trail starring the two sisters ran from 1949 until 1956. The McKeans began recording, and from 1951 with Rodeo Label they cut such trademark hits as "Gymkhana Yodel" and "Yodel Down The Valley". During this time, Joy McKean first met Slim Dusty, introduced by radio DJ Tim McNamara in Sydney.

Marriage and musical partnership with Slim Dusty

Joy McKean married Slim Dusty (real name David Kirkpatrick) in 1951 (becoming Mrs Kirkpatrick, but retaining Joy McKean as her stage name). Sister Heather met Reg Lindsay, whom she married in 1954 and the sisters began solo careers and partnerships with two of Australia's leading male country music singers. McKean was Dusty's wife and manager for over 50 years, creating a hugely successful body of work. Dusty and McKean had two children: Anne Kirkpatrick and David Kirkpatrick who are also accomplished singer-songwriters. The family began annual round Australia tours in 1964 – encompassing a 30,000-mile, 10-month journey which was the subject of a feature film, The Slim Dusty Movie in 1984.

Dusty attained international success with his 1957 hit "A Pub With No Beer", and remained at the forefront of Australian country music from that time until his death in 2003. Together they produced more than 100 albums, sold eight million records in Australia alone, and earned 45 Golden Guitars. McKean developed a flair for melody and musical storytelling with vivid evocative imagery. She was awarded the first ever Golden Guitar award in 1973, for writing "Lights on the Hill", performed by Dusty. Other popular songs written by McKean for her husband include: "Walk A Country Mile", "Indian Pacific", "Kelly's Offsider", "The Angel of Goulburn Hill" and "The Biggest Disappointment".

McKean was awarded the Medal of the Order of Australia in 1991 for "service to the entertainment industry".

In 1993 the McKean Sisters reunited to record a CD, "The McKeans on Stage" and continued to perform together on stage various times with the Slim Dusty Show over the subsequent decade leading up to Slim's death in 2003 and Tamworth's tribute "Concert for Slim" in 2004. This tribute concert brought together over 30 Australian music artists and featured an historic duet performance by McKean and Paul Kelly of "Sunlander" and a cover of McKean's Lights on the Hill performed by Keith Urban.

Later career 

Joy McKean received her 6th Golden Guitar award in 2007 with Peppimenarti Cradle winning the Award for Bush Ballad of the Year. McKean celebrated her 80th birthday in 2010 with the Happy Birthday Joy concert at Capitol Theatre in Tamworth during the Country Music Festival in January 2010.

McKean is one of the founders of the Tamworth Country Music Festival and the Country Music Association of Australia, and is also a biographer ("Slim Dusty: Another Day, Another Town"). McKean is Chair of the Slim Dusty Foundation Ltd, the organisation established to build and operate the Slim Dusty Centre in Slim's home town of Kempsey, NSW. The centre opened in October 2015.

 Documentary film
The 2020 Australian documentary film Slim and I, directed by Kriv Stenders was released when Joy was aged 90, and told the story of her life with Slim Dusty. The film features covers of McKean songs by acclaimed contemporary artists including Missy Higgins, Paul Kelly, Troy Cassar-Daley and Keith Urban.

Film critic Paul Byrnes wrote: "Kriv Stenders (Red Dog) gives us a loving portrait of one of the most important songwriters this country has produced – and it’s not Slim Dusty. Aficionados already knew Joy McKean wrote many of her husband’s best songs – in particular, Lights on the Hill and The Biggest Disappointment. Slim and I makes clear that she also kept the Slim Dusty Show on the road, managed the band, raised the kids and kept her husband from straying too far from the path of righteousness... ".

The film soundtrack included a new McKean composition "I Don't Believe You", co-written with grandson James Arneman, and his wife Flora Smith, and described by Rolling Stone as "McKean at her most honest and poignant, with her iconic songwriting shining through in what is her first composition in over a decade."

Honours and awards

APRA Awards
The APRA Awards are presented annually from 1982 by the Australasian Performing Right Association (APRA), "honouring composers and songwriters".

|-
| 2021 || Joy McKean|| Ted Albert Award for Outstanding Services to Australian Music ||

Australian Roll of Renown
The Australian Roll of Renown honours Australian and New Zealander musicians who have shaped the music industry by making a significant and lasting contribution to Country Music. It was inaugurated in 1976 and the inductee is announced at the Country Music Awards of Australia in Tamworth in January. Joy has been recognised twice; once as part of The McKean Sisters and individually in 2020.

|-
| 1983
| The McKean Sisters
| Australian Roll of Renown
| 
|-
| 2020
| Joy McKean 
| Australian Roll of Renown
|

Australian Women in Music Awards
The Australian Women in Music Awards is an annual event that celebrates outstanding women in the Australian Music Industry who have made significant and lasting contributions in their chosen field. They commenced in 2018.

|-
| 2019
| Joy McKean
| Lifetime Achievement Award
|

Country Music Awards of Australia
The Country Music Awards of Australia (CMAA) (also known as the Golden Guitar Awards) is an annual awards night held in January during the Tamworth Country Music Festival, celebrating recording excellence in the Australian country music industry. They have been held annually since 1973.
(wins only)
|-
| 1973
| "Lights on the Hill" (written by Joy McKean) recorded by Slim Dusty
| APRA Song of the Year
| 
|-
| 1975
| "Biggest Disappointment" (written by Joy McKean) recorded by Slim Dusty
| APRA Song of the Year
| 
|-
| 1978
| "Indian Pacific" (written by Joy McKean) recorded by Slim Dusty
| APRA Song of the Year
| 
|-
| 1979
| "Beat of the Government Stroke" (written by Joy McKean & Tom Oliver) recorded by Slim Dusty
| APRA Song of the Year
| 
|-
| 1998
| "Lady Is a Truckie" (written by Joy McKean) recorded by Slim Dusty
| Bush Ballad of the Year
| 
|-
| 2007
| "Peppimenarti Cradle" (written by Joy McKean) recorded by Anne Kirkpatrick
| Bush Ballad of the Year
|

Tamworth Songwriters Awards
The Tamworth Songwriters Association (TSA) is an annual songwriting contest for original country songs, awarded in January at the Tamworth Country Music Festival. They commenced in 1986. Joy McKean has won three awards.
 (wins only)
|-
| 1993
| "Calloused Hands" by Joy McKean and Tony Brooks
| Traditional Bush Ball of the Year
| 
|-
| 1994
| "Ringer from the Top End" by Joy McKean
| Traditional Bush Ball of the Year
| 
|-
| 2005
| Joy McKean
| Tex Morton Award
|

External links
Tribute to the McKean Sisters by Kate Nugent and Max Ellis, 26 January 2007.
ABC Country: Slim Dusty with Joy Mckean
The Slim Dusty Movie on The Internet Movie Database

References

Australian country singers
Living people
Australian country singer-songwriters
1930 births
Australian women singer-songwriters
Recipients of the Medal of the Order of Australia